is the J-pop duoあ Rythem's third single under Sony Music Entertainment Japan. This single was released on November 19, 2003. The single only managed to peak at the #94 spot in the Oricon weekly charts making it their second consecutive single that didn't reach the top 30 and the second weakest single that the duo released.

The item's stock number is AICL-1496.

Track listing
"Blue Sky Blue"
Composition: Rei Nakanishi
Arrangement: Hiroshi Miyagawa
Lyrics: Nobuyuki Shimizu
"Onna Tomodachi"
"Blue Sky Blue" (Brass Band version)
"Blue Sky Blue" (instrumental)

2003 singles
Rythem songs
2003 songs
Sony Music Entertainment Japan singles